Admiring Silence is a 1996 novel by Abdulrazak Gurnah. It is Gurnah's fifth novel and was first published by The New Press on 1 November 1996.

The plot follows an unnamed Zanzibari man living in England, after fleeing there in the early 1960s. In England he becomes a teacher and raises a daughter with his white English lover. After his 20-year exile from his homeland, the narrator travels back to Zanzibar to reflect on his past and finds a place that is no longer home.

The book received positive reviews from critics. A reviewer for Kirkus Reviews described it as a "beautifully calibrated story of a wrenching search for home" and praised its themes of immigration and colonialism. Publishers Weekly applauded Gurnah's examination of cultural issues and the narrator's characterization.

References

1996 novels
Books by Abdulrazak Gurnah